Björn Michel (born 7 February 1975 in Wiesbaden) is a German former field hockey player who competed in the 2000 Summer Olympics and in the 2004 Summer Olympics.

References

External links

1975 births
Living people
German male field hockey players
Olympic field hockey players of Germany
Field hockey players at the 2000 Summer Olympics
Field hockey players at the 2004 Summer Olympics
Olympic bronze medalists for Germany
Olympic medalists in field hockey
Sportspeople from Wiesbaden
Medalists at the 2004 Summer Olympics
1998 Men's Hockey World Cup players
2002 Men's Hockey World Cup players
20th-century German people
21st-century German people